"Phantom Limb" is a song by the American rock band Alice in Chains and the tenth track on their fifth studio album, The Devil Put Dinosaurs Here (2013). The lyrics were written by Alice in Chains' co-lead vocalist and rhythm guitarist William DuVall, who also played the guitar solo in the song, the first solo he wrote for Alice in Chains. The song premiered on radio via Seattle station KISW on March 25, 2013.

Snippets of "Phantom Limb" were featured on the Alice in Chains mockumentary AIC 23, released on April 3, 2013. A music video was released for the song on October 28, 2014 via BitTorrent Bundle.

Origin and recording
Songwriter and Alice in Chains' co-lead vocalist and rhythm guitarist William DuVall explained the song to Recoil magazine in April 2014:

Live performances
Alice in Chains performed "Phantom Limb" for the first time during their concert at the Eagles Ballroom in Milwaukee on May 15, 2013.

Music video
The music video was directed by Robert Schober, also known as Roboshobo, who also directed the music videos for Alice in Chains' songs "Hollow", "Stone" and "Voices". The video premiered exclusively on BitTorrent Bundle on October 28, 2014, and was available for free streaming and download. The bundle also included the video treatment and the shot list in PDF, as well as access to the band's merch.

The video does not feature the band. It tells the story of two men – one older, one younger – pitted against each other. The younger man forces his way into the house of the older man and begins to assault him. The video ends with a supernatural twist.

Personnel
William DuVall – lead vocals, lead guitar
Jerry Cantrell – backing vocals, rhythm guitar
Mike Inez – bass guitar
Sean Kinney – drums

References

External links

"Phantom Limb" on Setlist.fm
"Phantom Limb" on BitTorrent Bundle

2013 songs
Alice in Chains songs
Songs written by William DuVall
Songs written by Jerry Cantrell
Songs written by Sean Kinney
Songs written by Mike Inez
American heavy metal songs
Doom metal songs
Song recordings produced by Nick Raskulinecz